Chan Hao-ching and Chan Yung-jan were the defending champions, but lost in the semifinals to Sania Mirza and Barbora Strýcová.

Mirza and Strýcová went on to win the title, defeating Martina Hingis and CoCo Vandeweghe in the final, 7–5, 6–4.

Seeds
The top four seeds received a bye into the second round.

Draw

Finals

Top half

Bottom half

External links
 Main draw

Western and Southern Open Doubles
Women's Doubles